The Dzungar Khanate, also written as the Zunghar Khanate, was an Inner Asian khanate of Oirat Mongol origin. At its greatest extent, it covered an area from southern Siberia in the north to present-day Kyrgyzstan in the south, and from the Great Wall of China in the east to present-day Kazakhstan in the west. The core of the Dzungar Khanate is today part of northern Xinjiang, also called Dzungaria.

About 1620 the western Mongols, known as the Oirats, united in Dzungaria. In 1678, Galdan received from the Dalai Lama the title of Boshogtu Khan, making the Dzungars the leading tribe within the Oirats. The Dzungar rulers used the title of Khong Tayiji, which translates into English as "crown prince". Between 1680 and 1688, the Dzungars conquered the Tarim Basin, which is now southern Xinjiang, and defeated the Khalkha Mongols to the east. In 1696, Galdan was defeated by the Qing dynasty and lost Outer Mongolia. In 1717 the Dzungars conquered Tibet, but were driven out a year later by the Qing. In 1755, Qing China took advantage of a Dzungar civil war to conquer Dzungaria and destroyed the Dzungars as a people. The destruction of the Dzungars led to the Qing conquest of Mongolia, Tibet, and the creation of Xinjiang as a political administrative unit.

Etymology 
"Dzungar" is a compound of the Mongolian word jegün (züün), meaning "left" or "east" and γar meaning "hand" or "wing". The region of Dzungaria derives its name from this confederation. Although the Dzungars were located west of the Khalkas, the derivation of their name has been attributed to the fact that they represented the left wing of the Oirats. In the early 17th century, the head of the Oirat confederation was the leader of the Khoshut, Gushi Khan. When Gushi Khan decided to invade Tibet to replace the local Tsangpa khan in favor of rule by the Gelug, the Oirat army was organized into left and right wing. The right wing consisting of Khoshuts and Torguts remained in Tibet while the Choros and Khoid of the Left wing retreated north into the Tarim basin, since then the powerful empire of the Choros became known as the Left Wing, i.e. Zuungar.

The region was separately described in contemporary European sources as the Kingdom of the Eleuths, from an infelicitous transcription of the name "Oirats" by French missionaries. This was sometimes vaguely extended to cover wide areas of Central Asia, including Afghanistan.

History

Origin 

The Oirats were originally from the area of Tuva during the early 13th century. Their leader, Quduqa Bäki, submitted to Genghis Khan in 1208 and his house intermarried with all four branches of the Genghisid line. During the Toluid Civil War, the Four Oirat (Choros, Torghut, Dörbet, and Khoid) sided with Ariq Böke and therefore never accepted Kublaid rule. After the Yuan dynasty's collapse, the Oirats supported the Ariq Bökid Jorightu Khan Yesüder in seizing the Northern Yuan throne. The Oirats held sway over the Northern Yuan khans until the death of Esen Taishi in 1455, after which they migrated west due to Khalkha Mongol aggression. In 1486, the Oirats became embroiled in a succession dispute which gave Dayan Khan the opportunity to attack them. In the latter half of the 16th century, the Oirats lost more territory to the Tumed.

In 1620, the leaders of the Choros and Torghut Oirats, Kharkhul and Mergen Temene, attacked Ubasi Khong Tayiji, the first Altan Khan of the Khalkha. They were defeated and Kharkhul lost his wife and children to the enemy. An all out war between Ubasi and the Oirats lasted until 1623 when Ubasi was killed. In 1625, a conflict erupted between the Khoshut chief Chöükür and his uterine brother Baibaghas over inheritance issues. Baibaghas was killed in the fight. However, his younger brothers Güshi Khan and Köndölön Ubashi took up the fight and pursued Chöükür from the Ishim River to the Tobol River, attacking and killing his tribal followers in 1630. The infighting among the Oirats caused the Torghut chief Kho Orluk to migrate westwards until they came into conflict with the Nogai Horde, which they destroyed. The Torghuts founded the Kalmyk Khanate but still stayed in contact with the Oirats in the east. Every time a great assembly was called, they sent representatives to attend.

In 1632, the Gelug Yellow Hat sect in Qinghai was being repressed by the Khalkha Choghtu Khong Tayiji, so they invited Güshi Khan to come and deal with him. In 1636, Güshi led 10,000 Oirats in an invasion of Qinghai which resulted in the defeat of a 30,000 strong enemy army and the death of Choghtu. He then entered Central Tibet, where he received from the 5th Dalai Lama the title of Bstan-'dzin Choskyi Rgyal-po (the Dharma King Who Upholds the Religion). He then claimed the title of Khan, the first non-Genghisid Mongol to do so, and summoned the Oirats to completely conquer Tibet, creating the Khoshut Khanate. Among those involved was Kharkhul's son, Erdeni Batur, who was granted the title of Khong Tayiji, married the khan's daughter Amin Dara, and sent back to establish the Dzungar Khanate on the upper Emil River south of the Tarbagatai Mountains. Batur returned to Dzungaria with the title Erdeni (given by the Dalai Lama) and much booty. During his reign he made three expeditions against the Kazakhs. The conflicts by the Dzungars are remembered in a Kazakh ballad Elim-ai. The Dzungars also went to war against the Kyrgyz, Tajiks, and Uzbeks when they invaded deep into Central Asia to Yasi (Turkestan) and Tashkent in 1643.

Succession dispute (1653–1677)

In 1653, Sengge succeeded his father Batur, but he faced dissent from his half brothers. With the support of Ochirtu Khan of the Khoshut, this strife ended with Sengge's victory in 1661. In 1667 he captured Erinchin Lobsang Tayiji, the third and last Altan Khan. However, he himself was assassinated by his half-brothers Chechen Tayiji and Zotov in a coup in 1670.

Sengge's younger brother Galdan Boshugtu Khan had been residing in Tibet at the time. Upon his birth in 1644 he was recognized as the reincarnation of a Tibetan lama who had died the previous year. In 1656 he left for Tibet, where he received education from Lobsang Chökyi Gyaltsen, 4th Panchen Lama and the 5th Dalai Lama. Upon learning of his brother's death, he immediately returned from Tibet and took revenge on Chechen. Allied with Ochirtu Sechen of the Khoshut, Galdan defeated Chechen, and drove Zotov out of Dzungaria. In 1671 The Dalai Lama bestowed the title of Khan on Galdan. Sengge's two sons Sonom Rabdan and Tsewang Rabtan revolted against Galdan but they were defeated. Although, already married Anu-Dara, granddaughter of Ochirtu, he came into conflict with his grandfather in law. Fearing Galdan's popularity, Ochirtu supported his uncle and rival Choqur Ubashi who refused to recognize Galdan's title. The victory over Ochirtu in 1677 resulted Galdan's domination of the Oirats. In the next year the Dalai Lama gave the highest title of Boshoghtu (or Boshughtu) Khan to him,

Conquest of the Yarkent Khanate (1678–1680) 

From the late 16th century onward, the Yarkent Khanate fell under the influence of the Khojas. The Khojas were Naqshbandi Sufis who claimed descent from the prophet Muhammad or from the Rashidun caliphs. By the reign of Sultan Said Khan in the early 16th century, the Khojas already had a strong influence in court and over the khan. In 1533, an especially influential Khoja named Makhdum-i Azam arrived in Kashgar, where he settled and had two sons. These two sons hated each other and they passed down their mutual hatred down to their children. The two lineages came to dominate large parts of the khanate, splitting it between two factions: the Aq Taghliq (White Mountain) in Kashgar and the Qara Taghliq (Black Mountain) in Yarkand. Yulbars patronized the Aq Taghliqs and suppressed the Qara Taghliqs, which caused much resentment, and resulted in his assassination in 1670. He was succeeded by his son who ruled from only a brief period before Ismail Khan was enthroned. Ismail reversed the power struggle between the two Muslim factions and drove out the Aq Taghliq leader, Afaq Khoja. Afaq fled to Tibet, where the 5th Dalai Lama aided him in enlisting the help of Galdan Boshugtu Khan.

In 1680, Galdan led 120,000 Dzungars into the Yarkent Khanate. They were aided by the Aq Taghliqs and Hami and Turpan, which had already submitted to the Dzungars. Ismail's son Babak Sultan died in the resistance against in the battle for Kashgar. The general Iwaz Beg died in the defense of Yarkand. The Dzungars defeated the Moghul forces without much difficulty and took Ismail and his family prisoner. Galdan installed Abd ar-Rashid Khan II, son of Babak, as puppet khan.

First Kazakh war (1681–1685)

In 1681, Galdan invaded the north of Tengeri Mountain and attacked the Kazakh Khanate but failed to take Sayram. In 1683 Galdan's armies under Tsewang Rabtan took Tashkent and Sayram. They reached the Syr Darya and crushed two Kazakh armies. After that Galdan subjugated the Black Kyrgyz and ravaged the Fergana Valley. His general Rabtan took Taraz city. From 1685 Galdan's forces aggressively pushed westward, forcing the Kazakhs ever further west. The Dzungars established dominion over the Baraba Tatars and extracted yasaq (tribute) from them. Converting to Orthodox Christianity and becoming Russian subjects was a tactic by the Baraba to find an excuse not to pay yasaq to the Dzungars.

Khalkha war (1687–1688)

The Oirats had established peace with the Khalkha Mongols since Ligdan Khan died in 1634 and the Khalkhas were preoccupied with the rise of the Qing dynasty. However, when the Jasaghtu Khan Shira lost part of his subjects to the Tüsheet Khan Chikhundorj, Galdan moved his orda near the Altai Mountains to prepare an attack. Chikhundorj attacked the right wing of the Khalkhas and killed Shira in 1687. In 1688, Galdan dispatched troops under his younger brother Dorji-jav against Chikhundorj but they were eventually defeated. Dorji-jav was killed in battle. Chikhundorj then murdered Degdeehei Mergen Ahai of the Jasaghtu Khan who was on the way to Galdan. To avenge the death of his brother, Galdan established friendly relations with the Russians who were already at war with Chikhundorj over territories near Lake Baikal. Armed with Russian firearms, Galdan led 30,000 Dzungar troops into Khalkha Mongolia in 1688 and defeated Chikhundorj in three days. The Siberian Cossacks, meanwhile, attacked and defeated a Khalkha army of 10,000 near Lake Baikal. After two bloody battles with the Dzungars near Erdene Zuu Monastery and Tomor, Chakhundorji and his brother Jebtsundamba Khutuktu Zanabazar fled across the Gobi Desert to the Qing dynasty and submitted to the Kangxi Emperor.

First Qing war (1690–1696)

Late in the summer of 1690, Galdan crossed the Kherlen River with a force of 20,000 and engaged a Qing army at Battle of Ulan Butung 350 kilometers north of Beijing near the western headwaters of the Liao River. Galdan was forced to retreat and escaped total destruction because the Qing army did not have the supplies or ability to pursue him. In 1696, the Kangxi Emperor led 100,000 troops into Mongolia. Galdan fled from the Kherlen only to be caught by another Qing army attacking from the west. He was defeated in the ensuing Battle of Jao Modo near the upper Tuul River. Galdan's wife, Anu, was killed and the Qing army captured 20,000 cattle and 40,000 sheep. Galdan fled with a small handful of followers. In 1697 he died in the Altai Mountains near Khovd on 4 April. Back in Dzungaria, his nephew Tsewang Rabtan, who had revolted in 1689, was already in control as of 1691.

Chagatai rebellion (1693–1705)
Galdan installed Abd ar-Rashid Khan II, son of Babak, as puppet khan in the Yarkent Khanate. The new khan forced Afaq Khoja to flee again, but Abd ar-Rashid's reign was also ended unceremoniously two years later when riots erupted in Yarkand. He was replaced by his brother Muhammad Imin Khan. Muhammad sought help from the Qing dynasty, Khanate of Bukhara, and the Mughal Empire in combating the Dzungars. In 1693, Muhammad conducted a successful attack on the Dzungar Khanate, taking 30,000 captives. Unfortunately Afaq Khoja appeared again and overthrew Muhammad in a revolt led by his followers. Afaq's son Yahiya Khoja was enthroned but his reign was cut short in 1695 when both he and his father were killed while suppressing local rebellions. In 1696, Akbash Khan was placed on the throne, but the begs of Kashgar refused to recognize him, and instead allied with the Kyrgyz to attack Yarkand, taking Akbash prisoner. The begs of Yarkand went to the Dzungars, who sent troops and ousted the Kyrgyz in 1705. The Dzungars installed a non-Chagatayid ruler Mirza Alim Shah Beg, thereby ending the rule of Chagatai khans forever. Abdullah Tarkhan Beg of Hami also rebelled in 1696 and defected to the Qing dynasty. In 1698, Qing troops were stationed in Hami.

Second Kazakh war (1698)
In 1698 Galdan's successor Tsewang Rabtan reached Tengiz lake and Turkestan, and the Dzungars controlled Zhei-Su and Tashkent until 1745. The Dzungars' war on the Kazakhs pushed them into seeking aid from Russia.

Second Qing war (1718–1720)

Tsewang Rabtan's brother Tseren Dondup invaded the Khoshut Khanate in 1717, deposed Yeshe Gyatso, killed Lha-bzang Khan, and looted Lhasa. The Kangxi Emperor retaliated in 1718, but his military expedition was annihilated by the Dzungars in the Battle of the Salween River, not far from Lhasa. A second and larger expedition sent by Kangxi expelled the Dzungars from Tibet in 1720. They brought Kälzang Gyatso with them from Kumbum to Lhasa and installed him as the 7th Dalai Lama in 1721. The people of Turpan and Pichan took advantage of the situation to rebel under a local chief, Amin Khoja, and defected to the Qing dynasty.

Galdan Tseren (1727–1745)
Tsewang Rabtan died suddenly in 1727 and was succeeded by his son Galdan Tseren. Galdan Tseren drove out his half-brother Lobszangshunu. He continued the war against the Kazakhs and the Kalkha Mongols. In retaliation against attacks against his Khalkha subjects, the Yongzheng Emperor of the Qing dynasty sent an invasion force of 10,000, which the Dzungars defeated near the Khoton Lake. The next year however, the Dzungars suffered a defeat against the Khalkhas near Erdene Zuu Monastery. In 1731, the Dzungars attacked Turpan, which had previously defected to the Qing dynasty. Amin Khoja led the people of Turpan in a retreat into Gansu where they settled in Guazhou. In 1739, Galdan Tseren agreed to the boundary between Khalkha and Dzungar territory.

Collapse (1745–1755)

Galdan Tseren died in 1745, triggering widespread rebellion in the Tarim Basin, and starting a succession dispute among his sons. In 1749 Galden Tseren's son Lama Dorji seized the throne from his younger brother, Tsewang Dorji Namjal. He was overthrown by his cousin Dawachi and the Khoid noble Amursana, but they too fought over control of the khanate. As a result of their dispute, in 1753, three of Dawachi's relatives ruling the Dörbet and Bayad defected to the Qing and migrated into Khalkha territory. The next year, Amursana also defected. In 1754, Yusuf, the ruler of Kashgar, rebelled and forcefully converted the Dzungars living there to Islam. His older brother, Jahan Khoja of Yarkand, also rebelled but was captured by the Dzungars due to the treachery of Ayyub Khoja of Aksu. Jahan's son Sadiq gathered 7,000 men in Khotan and attacked Aksu in retaliation. In the spring of 1755, the Qianlong Emperor sent an army of 50,000 against Dawachi. They met almost no resistance and destroyed the Dzungar Khanate within the span of 100 days.

Dawachi fled into the mountains north of Aksu but was captured by Khojis, the beg of Uchturpan, and delivered to the Qing.

Aftermath

Amursana's rebellion (1755–1757)

After defeating the Dzungar Khanate, the Qing planned to install khans for each of the four Oirat tribes, but Amursana wanted to rule over all the Oirats. Instead the Qianlong Emperor made him only khan of the Khoid. In the summer, Amursana along with Mongol leader Chingünjav led a revolt against the Qing. Unable to defeat the Qing, Amursana fled north to seek refuge with the Russians and died of smallpox in Russian lands. In the spring of 1762 his frozen body was brought to Kyakhta for the Manchu to see. The Russians then buried it, refusing the Manchu request that it be handed over for posthumous punishment.

Aq Taghliq rebellion (1757–1759)

When Amursana rebelled against the Qing dynasty, the Aq Taghliq khojas Burhanuddin and Jahan rebelled in Yarkand. Their rule was not popular and the people greatly disliked them for appropriating anything they needed from clothing to livestock. In February 1758, The Qing sent Yaerhashan and Zhao Hui with 10,000 troops against the Aq Taghliq regime. Zhao Hui was besieged by enemy forces at Yarkand until January 1759, but otherwise the Qing army did not encounter any difficulties on campaign. The khoja brothers fled to Badakhshan where they were captured by the ruler Sultan Shah, who executed them and handed Jahan's head to the Qing. The Tarim Basin was pacified in 1759.

Genocide

According to the Qing scholar Wei Yuan (1794–1857), the Dzungar population before the Qing conquest was around 600,000 in 200,000 households. Wei Yuan wrote that about 40 percent of the Dzungar households were killed by smallpox, 20 percent fled to Russia or Kazakh tribes, and 30 percent were killed by Manchu bannermen. For several thousands of li, there were no gers except of those who had surrendered. Wen-Djang Chu wrote that 80 percent of the 600,000 or more Dzungars were destroyed by disease and attack which Michael Clarke described as "the complete destruction of not only the Dzungar state but of the Dzungars as a people."

It's argued by the historian Peter Perdue that the destruction of the Dzungars was the result of an explicit policy of extermination launched by the Qianlong Emperor which lasted for two years. His commanders were reluctant to carry out his orders, which he repeated several times using the term jiao (extermination) over and over again. The commanders Hadaha and Agui were punished for only occupying Dzungar lands but letting the people escape. The generals Jaohui and Shuhede were punished for not showing sufficient zeal in exterminating rebels. Qianlong explicitly ordered the Khalkha Mongols to "take the young and strong and massacre them." The elderly, children, and women were spared but they could not preserve their former names or titles. Mark Levene, a historian whose recent research interests focus on genocide, states that the extermination of the Dzungars was "arguably the eighteenth century genocide par excellence."

Widespread anti-Dzungar opinion by former Dzungar subjects contributed to their genocide. The Muslim Kazakhs and former people of the Yarkent Khanate in the Tarim Basin (now called Uyghurs), were treated poorly under by the Buddhist Dzungars, who used them as slave labor, and participated in the Qing invasion and attacked the Dzungars. Uyghur leaders like Khoja Emin were granted titles within the Qing nobility, and acted as an intermediary with Muslims from the Tarim Basin. They told the Muslims that the Qing only wanted to kill Oirats and that they would leave the Muslims alone. They also convinced the Muslims to aid the Qing in killing Oirates.

Demographic change in Xinjiang

After the destruction of the Dzungar Oirat people, the Qing dynasty sponsored the settlement of millions of Han, Hui, Xibe, Daur, Solon, Turkic Oasis people (Uyghurs) and Manchus in Dzungaria since the land had been emptied. Stanley W. Toops notes that modern Xinjiang's demographic situation still reflects the settlement initiative of the Qing dynasty. One third of Xinjiang's total population consisted of Han, Hui, and Kazakhs in the north while around two-thirds were Uyghurs in southern Xinjiang's Tarim Basin. Some cities in northern Xinjiang such as Ürümqi and Yining were essentially made by the Qing settlement policy.

The elimination of the Buddhist Dzungars led to the rise of Islam and its Muslim Begs as the predominant moral political authority in Xinjiang. Many Muslim Taranchis also moved to northern Xinjiang. According to Henry Schwarz, "the Qing victory was, in a certain sense, a victory for Islam". Ironically, the destruction of the Dzungars by the Qing led to the consolidation of Turkic Muslim power in the region, since Turkic Muslim culture and identity was tolerated or even promoted by the Qing.

In 1759, the Qing dynasty proclaimed that the land formerly belonging to the Dzungars was now part of "China" (Dulimbai Gurun) in a Manchu memorial. The Qing ideology of unification portrayed the "outer" non-Han Chinese like the Mongols, Oirats, and Tibetans together with the "inner" Han Chinese as "one family" united in the Qing state. The Qing described the phrase "Zhong Wai Yi Jia" (中外一家) or "Nei Wai Yi Jia" (內外一家, "interior and exterior as one family"), to convey this idea of "unification" to different peoples.

Leaders of the Dzungar Khanate 

 Khara Khula, title: Khong Tayiji
 Erdeni Batur, title: Khong Tayiji
 Sengge, title: Khong Tayiji
 Galdan Boshugtu Khan, titles: Khong Tayiji, Boshogtu Khan
 Tsewang Rabtan, title: Khong Tayiji, Khan
 Galdan Tseren, title: Khong Tayiji 
 Tsewang Dorji Namjal, title: Khong Tayiji
 Lama Dorji, title: Khong Tayiji
 Dawachi, title: Khong Tayiji
 Amursana‡

‡ Note: Although Amursana had de facto control of some areas of Dzungaria during 1755–1756, he could never officially become Khan due to the inferior rank of his clan, the Khoid.

Culture
The Oirats converted to Tibetan Buddhism in 1615.

Oirat society was similar to other nomadic societies. It was heavily dependent on animal husbandry but also practiced limited agriculture. After the conquest of the Yarkent Khanate in 1680, they used people from the Tarim Basin as slave labour to cultivate land in Dzungaria. The Dzungar economy and industry was fairly complex for a nomadic society. They had iron, copper, and silver mines producing raw ore, which the Dzungars made into weapons and shields, including even firearms, bullets, and other utensils. The Dzungars were able to indigenously manufacture firearms to a degree that was unique in Central Asia at the time. In 1762, the Qing army discovered four large Dzungar bronze cannons, eight "soaring" cannons, and 10,000 shells.

In 1640, the Oirats created an Oirat Mongol Legal Code which regulated the tribes and gave support to the Gelug Yellow Hat sect. Erdeni Batur assisted Zaya Pandita in creating the Clear Script.

Gallery

See also 

 Choros (Oirats)
 Dzungar people
 Dzungaria
 Khoshut Khanate
 Kalmyk Khanate
 Tibet–Ladakh–Mughal War

References

Citations

General and cited sources 
 
 
 
 
 
 
 
 
 
 
 

 
 
 
 
 Хойт С.К. Последние данные по локализации и численности ойрат  // Проблемы этногенеза и этнической культуры тюрко-монгольских народов. Вып. 2. Элиста: Изд-во КГУ, 2008. стр. 136–157.
 Хойт С.К. Этническая история ойратских групп. Элиста, 2015. 199 с.
 Хойт С.К. Данные фольклора для изучения путей этногенеза ойратских групп // Международная научная конференция «Сетевое востоковедение: образование, наука, культура», 7–10 декабря 2017 г.: материалы. Элиста: Изд-во Калм. ун-та, 2017. с. 286–289.

External links 
 

 
Former countries in Chinese history
Former monarchies of Central Asia
History of Mongolia
Inner Asia
Khanates
Mongol states
Nomadic groups in Eurasia
Oirats
States and territories disestablished in 1758
States and territories established in 1634
Former empires